Walther Judeich (5 October 1859, Dresden – 24 February 1942, Jena) was a German ancient historian. His grandfather on his mother's side was publisher Heinrich Brockhaus (1804–1874).

He studied history at the Universities of Tübingen, Leipzig and Strasbourg. From 1886 to 1888 he took part in archaeological excavations in Greece and Asia Minor, followed by research in Rome, Pompeii and Sicily (1888–89). Later on, he taught classes at the Universities of Marburg, Czernowitz and Erlangen. From 1907 to 1931 he was a professor of ancient history at the University of Jena. His successor at Jena was Fritz Schachermeyr.

In 1905 he published his magnum opus, "Topographie von Athen" (Topography of Athens), a scientific guide to historical landmarks of Athens that has been issued in 31 editions up to the year 2012.

Published works 
 Caesar im Orient : kritische Übersicht der Ergebnisse vom. 9. Aug. 48 bis Oct. 47, (1885) – Caesar in the East, Critical overview of the events of 9 August 48 to October 47.
 Kleinasiatische studien. Untersuchungen zur Griechisch-Persischen Geschichte des IV. jahrhunderts, (1892) – "Klein asian" studies. Investigations of Greco-Persian history in the fourth century BC.
 Altertümer von Hierapolis, (1898; with Carl Humann, Franz Winter, Conrad Cichorius) – Antiquities of Hierapolis. 
 Topographie von Athen, (1905) – Topography of Athens.

References 

1859 births
1942 deaths
Writers from Dresden
19th-century German archaeologists
Academic staff of the University of Jena
Academic staff of the University of Marburg
Academic staff of the University of Erlangen-Nuremberg
Academic staff of Chernivtsi University
German male non-fiction writers
Leipzig University alumni
University of Tübingen alumni
University of Strasbourg alumni
20th-century German historians